The yellow-crowned whitestart (Myioborus flavivertex), Santa Marta whitestart or yellow-crowned redstart, is a species of bird in the family Parulidae. It is endemic to the highland forest and woodland in the Santa Marta Mountains in Colombia.

References

yellow-crowned whitestart
Birds of the Sierra Nevada de Santa Marta
Endemic birds of Colombia
yellow-crowned whitestart
yellow-crowned whitestart
Taxonomy articles created by Polbot